The Ramp is a  mountain summit located in the Chugach Mountains, in Anchorage Municipality in the U.S. state of Alaska. The mountain's name was officially adopted in 1981 by the United States Geological Survey. Access is via the Powerline Trail.

Climate

Based on the Köppen climate classification, The Ramp is located in a subarctic climate with long, cold, snowy winters, and mild summers. Temperatures can drop below −20 °C with wind chill factors below −30 °C. Precipitation runoff from the peak drains into Ship Creek and Campbell Creek.

See also
List of mountain peaks of Alaska
Geology of Alaska

References

External links

 Weather forecast: The Ramp

Mountains of Alaska
Mountains of Anchorage, Alaska
North American 1000 m summits